Noeleen Comiskey is an actress who played the recurring character of Marta Shirovs in EastEnders. Other television roles include Sarah Webb in Casualty, Hayley Nichols in Doctors and Nathalia Volkov in Legends, starring Sean Bean. She has also previously appeared in Law & Order: UK and The Bill.

Career 
Noeleen Comiskey has appeared in a number of television programmes including Big Train, Law & Order:UK, Casualty, Doctors and Legends. From 2014 to 2015, she played Marta Shirovs in the BBC One soap Eastenders. The character was the wife of Aleks Shirovs (Kristian Kiehling) and originally appeared with their daughter Ineta (Gledisa Osmani) before all three ultimately return to Latvia together.

She has appeared in a number of films including The Search for Simon, Winter Ridge and The Angel of Auschwitz in which she starred as Stanislawa Leczenska.

In 2019, she played the dangerous Ms M in the feature film Criminal Audition, which premiered at FrightFest 2019, and for which she received positive reviews.

She appears in the 2021 film The Obscure Life of the Grand Duke of Corsica, starring Timothy Spall.

Filmography

Film

Television

References

External links 
 
 

English film actresses
Living people
English television actresses
Year of birth missing (living people)